Pelentong River may refer to:
Pelentong River (Johor)
Pelentong River (Negeri Sembilan)